Chas Gerretsen (born 22 July 1943 in Groningen, Netherlands) is a Dutch-born war photographer, photojournalist and film advertising photographer.
His photographs of armed conflicts, Hollywood films and Celebrity Portraits have been published in major magazines.

Life 

Gerretsen left the Netherlands at the age of sixteen and after travelling through Europe for two years, immigrated to Australia in 1961. He first started to take pictures while working as a crocodile hunter in Cape York Peninsula, (Queensland, Australia)

In 1963 he immigrated to the U.S.A., landing in San Pedro, California, and while  working as a cowboy in Falfurrias, Texas, bought a movie camera and shot his first film footage.

In 1967 he arrived in Singapore and hitch-hiked through Malaysia to Bangkok, (Thailand) and via Kanchanaburi to the Three Pagodas Pass  where he spent three months with the pro-U Nu Burmese rebels under the command of General Bo Yan Naing.

He traveled through Laos, Cambodia and entered South Vietnam, on 14 February 1968 with the equivalent of US $0.75 in his pocket.

In 1969, he left South Vietnam and in 1970 covered the devastating 1970 Bhola cyclone in East Pakistan before  returning to Europe.
 
From 1970 to 1975, Chas would continue to photograph war, political upheavals, elections, droughts and conflicts in Cambodia, South Vietnam, Chile, Argentine, Colombia, Venezuela, Dominican Republic and Peru.

1975–1989 He resided in Hollywood, working on feature films in, as well as outside the USA.

Vietnam (1968–1969) 

On 14 February 1968, (during the Tet Offensive) he walked from Cambodia into South Vietnam (via Gò Dầu Ha) and soon thereafter started his career as a freelance photojournalist and cinematographer. He became friends with Dana Stone and his wife Louise  and acquired his first Nikon F with a 105 mm lens from Dana as well as his first lessons in what not to do when out on patrol.

In April 1968, he became a staff cameraman for UPITN but after one month had enough of being told what to do and became a freelance cameraman for ABC TV and as a freelance photojournalist sold his still negatives to Time Life, Newsweek and U.P.I.

At the end of '68 and beginning 1969, there was a relative quiet in South Vietnam and Chas as well as many of the other "resident" war photographers, left (among others: Sean Flynn and Dana Stone), only to return upon the American invasion of Cambodia.

Cambodia (1970–1972) 

In 1970, when hearing of the American invasion of Cambodia Chas bought a train ticket in Paris on the Orient Express to Istanbul, Turkey, and traveled on by bus through Iran, Afghanistan (Khyber Pass) to West Pakistan and from there, he flew to Phnom Penh, Cambodia. While in Cambodia, he continued working freelance and in addition started contributing articles (under the pseudonym of Bill Steiner) to the Copley News Service.

In 1972, he joined the French photo agency Gamma.

Chile (1973) 

In 1973 he won the Robert Capa Gold Medal with David Burnett and Raymond Depardon. He is best known for his coverage of the  1973 Chilean coup d'état. His famous photograph  of General Pinochet became the embodiment of the  Latin American Dictator, the opposite side of the political spectrum to Alberto Korda  photograph of Che Gueverra (Guerrillero Heroico).

The image of General Pinochet has an unusual history: it was used on posters, flyers and banners and was often reworked to portray the general as an inhuman monster.
And over the years continued to be used by various political factions to illustrate the perceived inhumanity of some political leaders.

In 1982 a couple of art student in Concepción copied Chas’ photo of general Pinochet with the premonitory message, “NINGUNA CALLE LLEVARA SU NOMBRE” (No street will bear your name) It was plastered on walls on the evening before the days of national protests.

The first time Chas photographed General Pinochet, unwittingly, was on 29 June 1973 during the failed "Coup d'Etat", known as El Tancazo, which the general, ironically, helped put down.

The images taken by Chas on 11 September 1973 were used in the initial concept of the reconstruction of the coup d'état in the film The House of the Spirits based on the novel of the same name by Isabel Allende, a niece of the former president Salvador Allende.

Hollywood (1975–1989)

In 1975, while visiting Gamma offices in Paris, wondering where to go next, a fellow Gamma photographer suggested, sarcastically, "why don't you go and find yourself a war in Hollywood."

In June 1975, Chas started the Hollywood office for Gamma and in 1977 co-founded the photo agency Mega Productions Inc. In 1976 he was hired as the still photographer/special photographer for the war film Apocalypse Now.

Apart from his still photographs, his contribution to the film was the suggestion, during a lunch with Francis Ford Coppola regarding the scene where a TV correspondent (played by Francis Ford Coppola) yells at some passing soldiers, "Don’t look at the camera." "..that if Francis wanted to mock TV correspondents in South Vietnam he should create a photojournalist because, "we were all crazy."

A couple of days later, after the arrival of Dennis Hopper, Chas was asked by Jerry Ziesmer  to report to Francis Ford Coppola: "on how to dress a combat photographer." From that moment on the role of Dennis Hopper as head honcho (Captain Colby) for Colonel Kurtz (Marlon Brando) was changed into that of a photojournalist. Chas sold three of his old Nikon F cameras with lenses to American Zoetrope and they were used by Dennis Hopper in the film.
These cameras are now on display in Coppola Winery Movie Museum, in Geyserville, California

Lee Beaupre,  publicist for "Apocalypse Now " until his murder in 1979, wrote in a publicity release on Chas Gerretsen as a war photographer for Apocalypse Now, "From Real to Reel". "His (Chas Gerretsen's) photographic career had come full circle." The release was later withdrawn since it was decided that Sean Flynn, son of actor Errol Flynn had more publicity value.

In 1984 Chas produced and directed a one-hour documentary "The Longest Holiday" a view on the Joys of Aging in Sun City, Arizona which was bought by RAI, ORTF and the BBC.

During his time in Hollywood, he worked as a "special advertising and publicity photographer" on over a hundred feature films.

After leaving the French photo agency Gamma over 80.000 of his photographic negatives and slides were missing, including many from Chile.

The remainder of his files, his negatives and slides are now stored in the archives of the Netherlands Photo Museum.

In June 2019, KINO Rotterdam made a short (32 min) documentary about Chas's life and the images he had taken during the six months he worked as a still photographer on Apocalypse Now. It was chosen for participation in the Il Cinema Ritrovato in Bologna, Italy. The documentary, 'The Dutch Angle: Chas Gerretsen & Apocalypse Now' created a lot of interest and was included in the Blue Ray release of 'Apocalypse Now Final Cut'.

Rediscovery 
Thirty-two years later, in 2021, at the age of 77, Gerretsen's photographs were 're-discovered'. A 256-page photobook, Apocalypse Now, The Lost Archives, with many never-before-published photographs taken during his six-months stay on the set in the Philippines was published by Prestel/Pinguin/Random House. The book was released worldwide in September 2021.

A retrospective exhibition of his work and life was exhibited 16 October 20218 May 2022 at the Nederlands Fotomuseum in Rotterdam. A 256 page catalogue, in English and Dutch, accompanied the exhibition.
 
In addition, his autobiography was released in the Netherlands on 11 September 2021, to excellent reviews by all the major Dutch newspapers.

Bibliography

2021 ”Apocalypse Now: The Lost Photo Archive” (English)  

2021 “Starring Chas Gerretsen” (English)  

2021 “In de Hoofdrol Chas Gerretsen” (Dutch)  

2021 “Het wonderbaarlijke en vreemde leven van Chas Gerretsen” (Dutch)  was originally written in English (“The marvelous and strange life of Chas Gerretsen”) and translated into Dutch. It has not been released in English.

Reviews & Interviews

2021 Rolling Stone Holiday Must-Haves https://www.rollingstone.com/product-recommendations/product-recommendations-lists/2021-holiday-gift-guide-1259566/apocalypse-now-the-lost-photo-archive-by-chas-gerretsen-1266741/]
2021 Interview (English, USA): Huck magazine  Apocalypse Now https://www.huckmag.com/art-and-culture/rediscovered-photos-from-the-set-of-apocalypse-now/]
Interview (English, USA): InsideHook  Apocalypse Now https://www.insidehook.com/article/movies/photographer-chas-gerretsen-behind-scenes-apocalypse-now]
”Apocalypse Now: The Lost Photo Archive” Exhibition book https://www.facebook.com/interartparis/videos/chas-gerretsen-apocalypse-nowprestel-publishingreli%C3%83%C2%A9-24-x-30-cm-256-pages-140-il/646695680042894]
“Starring Chas Gerretsen” Lecturis Exhibition book https://lecturis.nl/en/product/starring-chas-gerretsen-kopie/]
Interview (English) https://www.dutchnews.nl/features/2022/01/get-the-picture-no-matter-what-a-conversation-with-chas-gerretsen/]
Interview (Dutch): Volkskrant, met Chas Gerretsen https://www.volkskrant.nl/cultuur-media/chas-gerretsen-is-de-fotograaf-van-de-set-van-apocalypse-now-maar-ook-die-van-het-portret-van-pinochet~bec4a86b/]
Interview (Dutch): NRC Handelsblad, ‘Dendert voort in de geest van Hemingway, Kuifje en Ik, Jan Cremer.’ (paywall) https://www.nrc.nl/nieuws/2021/10/20/vakman-met-scherp-oog-voor-compositie-en-detail-a4062480]
Review (Dutch): NPO Radio 1, NOS Met het Oog op Morgen  Chas Gerretsen https://www.nporadio1.nl/nieuws/cultuur-media/bd0c4dd3-ccb3-48aa-845d-b534db668bf7/het-leven-van-chas-gerretsen-een-echte-avonturier]
Interview (Dutch): Khalid & Sophie: (Dutch) over het prachtige werk van Chas Gerretsen https://www.npostart.nl/fotograaf-chas-gerretsen-mijn-leven-is-een-serie/15-10-2021/POMS_BV_16666157]
Review (Dutch): Jeroen Vullings bij Nieuwsweekend op NPO Radio 1, Starts at 6 minutes https://www.nporadio1.nl/fragmenten/nieuwsweekend/5cb8ef8d-4446-4353-a82a-c6de1477ecff/2021-10-09-boekenrubriek-met-jeroen-vullings] 
Review (Dutch): Menno Bentveld bij Tijd voor Max. ‘Een bizar levensverhaal.’ Starts at 30 minutes https://www.npostart.nl/tijd-voor-max/15-04-2022/POW_05267985
2019 (Eng, UK): the Guardian  Apocalypse Now https://www.theguardian.com/film/gallery/2019/may/30/the-horror-apocalypse-now-unseen-in-pictures]
2019 (English) Dutch Angle: Chas Gerretsen & Apocalypse Now” (Video) Directed by Baris Azman https://mubi.com/films/dutch-angle-chas-gerretsen-apocalypse-now]

Literature
 Gerretsen, Chas. In: Wim van Sinderen et al.: Fotografen in Nederland : een anthologie 1852–2002. Ludion, Amsterdam; Fotomuseum, Den Haag 2002, S. 124–125.
 Veronica Hekking: Een foto als voertuig van de macht. Gebruik en hergebruik van Chas Gerretsens portret van Augusto Pinochet. In: Nelke Bartelings et al. (Hrsg.): Beelden in veelvoud. De vermenigvuldiging van het beeld in prentkunst en fotografie. Leids Kunsthistorisch Jaarboek 12, Leiden 2002, S. 409–426.

References

External links 
Netherlands Photo Museum: Archives Chas Gerretsen

Quotes 
On War: "Truth is a personal observation – as is photography. Reality is." (1976)
On Goals: "I'm going nowhere in particular, and I'm in no hurry to get there." (1989)
On Beliefs: "A "Belief" equals personal need, based on fear and fantasy." (2005)
On Being: “Man is Not the sum of his experiences, he is the sum, of what he has learned, and retained from his experiences” (2016)
On Stupidity: "The inability, or refusal to learn. (e.g. from experience)" (2019)

War photographers
Dutch war correspondents
Photography in Vietnam
Photography in Cambodia
1943 births
Living people
People from Groningen (city)
Dutch photojournalists